The Love Route is a 1915 American Western silent film directed and written by Allan Dwan based upon a play by Edward Peple. The film stars Harold Lockwood, Winifred Kingston, Donald Crisp, Jack Pickford, Dick La Reno, and Juanita Hansen. The film was released on February 25, 1915, by Paramount Pictures.

Plot

Cast 
 Harold Lockwood as John Ashby
 Winifred Kingston as Allene Houston
 Donald Crisp as Harry Marshall
 Jack Pickford as Billy Ball
 Dick La Reno as Col. Houston
 Juanita Hansen as Lilly Belle
 Marshall Neilan

References

External links 
 
 clearer version of Ad

1915 films
1915 Western (genre) films
Paramount Pictures films
Films directed by Allan Dwan
American black-and-white films
Silent American Western (genre) films
1910s English-language films
1910s American films